The  Arizona Rattlers season was the 16th season for the franchise. They looked to make the playoffs after finishing 2006 with an 8–8 record. They finished 4–12 record and missed the playoffs.

Coaching
Gene Nudo entered his second season as the head coach of the Rattlers.

Season schedule

Personnel moves

Acquired

Departures

2007 roster

Stats

Offense

Quarterback

Running backs

Wide receivers

Touchdowns

Defense

Special teams

Kick return

Kicking

Regular season

Week 1: vs Georgia Force

at the US Airways Center, Phoenix, Arizona

Scoring summary:

1st Quarter:

2nd Quarter:

3rd Quarter:

4th Quarter:

Week 2: vs Utah Blaze

at the US Airways Center, Phoenix, Arizona

Scoring summary:

1st Quarter:

2nd Quarter:

3rd Quarter:

4th Quarter:

Week 3: at Colorado Crush

at the Pepsi Center, Denver, Colorado

Scoring summary:

1st Quarter:

2nd Quarter:

3rd Quarter:

4th Quarter:

Week 4: vs Las Vegas Gladiators

at the US Airways Center, Phoenix, Arizona

Scoring summary:

1st Quarter:

2nd Quarter:

3rd Quarter:

4th Quarter:

Week 5: at Kansas City Brigade

at Kemper Arena, Kansas City, Missouri

Scoring summary:

1st Quarter:

2nd Quarter:

3rd Quarter:

4th Quarter:

Week 6: at Los Angeles Avengers

at the Staples Center, Los Angeles

Scoring summary:

1st Quarter:

2nd Quarter:

3rd Quarter:

4th Quarter:

Week 7: vs Nashville Kats

at the US Airways Center, Phoenix, Arizona

Scoring summary:

1st Quarter:

2nd Quarter:

3rd Quarter:

4th Quarter:

Week 8: at Utah Blaze

at EnergySolutions Arena, Salt Lake City

Scoring summary:

1st Quarter:

2nd Quarter:

3rd Quarter:

4th Quarter:

Week 9: at New York Dragons

at the Nassau Coliseum, Uniondale, New York

Scoring summary:

1st Quarter:

2nd Quarter:

3rd Quarter:

4th Quarter:

Week 10: vs San Jose SaberCats

at the US Airways Center, Phoenix, Arizona

Scoring summary:

1st Quarter:

2nd Quarter:

3rd Quarter:

4th Quarter:

Week 11: vs Austin Wranglers

at the US Airways Center, Phoenix, Arizona

Scoring summary:

1st Quarter:

2nd Quarter:

3rd Quarter:

4th Quarter:

Week 12: at Tampa Bay Storm

at the St. Pete Times Forum, Tampa, Florida

Scoring summary:

1st Quarter:

2nd Quarter:

3rd Quarter:

4th Quarter:

Week 13: vs Chicago Rush

at the US Airways Center, Phoenix, Arizona

Scoring summary:

1st Quarter:

2nd Quarter:

3rd Quarter:

4th Quarter:

Week 14: at Las Vegas Gladiators

at Orléans Arena, Las Vegas

Scoring summary:

1st Quarter:

2nd Quarter:

3rd Quarter:

4th Quarter:

Week 15: vs Los Angeles Avengers

at the US Airways Center, Phoenix, Arizona

Scoring summary:

1st Quarter:

2nd Quarter:

3rd Quarter:

4th Quarter:

Week 16: at San Jose SaberCats

at the HP Pavilion, San Jose, California

Scoring summary:

1st Quarter:

2nd Quarter:

3rd Quarter:

4th Quarter:

External links
Arizona Rattlers statistics

Arizona Rattlers
Arizona Rattlers seasons
Arizona Rattlers
2000s in Phoenix, Arizona